2143 Jimarnold, provisional designation , is a background asteroid from the inner regions of the asteroid belt, approximately 5 kilometers in diameter. It was discovered on 26 September 1973, by astronomer Eleanor Helin at the Palomar Observatory in California, United States. The asteroid was named after American cosmochemist, James R. Arnold.

Orbit and classification 

Jimarnold is a non-family asteroid from the main belt's background population. It orbits the Sun in the inner asteroid belt at a distance of 1.7–2.8 AU once every 3 years and 5 months (1,258 days; semi-major axis of 2.28 AU). Its orbit has an eccentricity of 0.23 and an inclination of 8° with respect to the ecliptic.

The body's observation arc begins with a precovery taken at Palomar in April 1954, almost two decades prior to its official discovery observation.

Physical characteristics

Diameter and albedo 

According to the survey carried out by the NEOWISE mission of NASA's Wide-field Infrared Survey Explorer, Jimarnold measures 4.934 kilometers in diameter and its surface has an albedo of 0.138.

Rotation period 

As of 2017, no rotational lightcurve of Jimarnold has been obtained from photometric observations. The body's rotation period, poles and shape remain unknown.

Naming 

This minor planet was named after James R. Arnold (1923–2012), professor of chemistry and director of California Space Science Institute at the University of California, San Diego. Arnold's cosmochemical research included the study of cosmic radiation, the origin of meteorites, for which he developed a computer model, the lunar soil and mapping of the Moon's composition. The official  was proposed by the discoverer and Eugene Shoemaker, and published by the Minor Planet Center on 1 July 1979.

In 2013, Arnold's son proposed that the interrobang ‽ be used as a symbol for the asteroid, reflecting his father's curiosity and his "insistence upon working with the resulting reality."

References

External links 
 Asteroid Lightcurve Database (LCDB), query form (info )
 Dictionary of Minor Planet Names, Google books
 Asteroids and comets rotation curves, CdR – Observatoire de Genève, Raoul Behrend
 Discovery Circumstances: Numbered Minor Planets (1)-(5000) – Minor Planet Center
 
 

002143
Discoveries by Eleanor F. Helin
Named minor planets
19730926